Cecil Renwick (26 July 1924 – 18 June 2014) was a New Zealand cricketer. He played two first-class matches for Auckland in 1959/60. He was awarded the Bert Sutcliffe Medal in 2011.

See also
 List of Auckland representative cricketers

References

External links
 

1924 births
2014 deaths
New Zealand cricketers
Auckland cricketers
Cricketers from Auckland